Digital Planet (previously known as Click and originally Go Digital) is a radio programme broadcast on the BBC World Service presented by Gareth Mitchell.  Alternating as contributors are Bill Thompson, Ghislaine Boddington and Angelica Mari, who comment on items in the programme and discuss them with Mitchell. The show, broadcast weekly, covers  technology stories and news from around the world.

History 
From 2001 to 2005, it was presented by Tracey Logan and during that time it was one of the BBC's few webcast programmes, with cameras providing a live feed. Regular guest presenter Gareth Mitchell, who had been with the show since 2001, took over as presenter full time on 11 January 2005.

Originally named Go Digital, the show was renamed Digital Planet on 28 March 2006. It was again renamed Click on 29 March 2011 to make it easier to recognise its status as a sister programme of the TV programme Click, which is broadcast on BBC News and BBC World News. The show's running time was reduced from 28 minutes to 18 minutes. In the episode aired 1 May 2019, the show announced that it had renamed itself back to Digital Planet.

Proposed Closure 
On the 29th September 2022, shortly after celebrating its 21st anniversary with a special broadcast from the BBC’s Radio Theatre in Old Broadcasting House in London, it was proposed ending the show as part of a restructure of programming as part of the wider ‘Proposals for a digital-first World Service’.

Show format and topics 
Digital Planet covers a wide range of issues affecting technology. The first broadcast each week is also live (at 20:30 UK time on a Tuesday evening), whereas before the 2011 changes, it was recorded. The show is now around 27 minutes long. Often there are segments on technological solutions to problems facing charitable or humanitarian causes, with a speaker representing the cause being interviewed by Mitchell. One example is the segment on a screen saver which harnessed the power of idling home PCs to help perform complex mathematical calculations to help cure malaria.

Other topics covered have included: 
 Modern plane technology
 problems with smartphone set up
 Blu-ray Disc vs. HD DVD
 The use of open source software around the world

Usually views sent either by e-mail, Facebook, Twitter or using the BBC News website are read out and discussed briefly by the hosts.

A special pre- and post show session for podcast listeners is produced which cannot be heard by those listening to broadcast radio. The fan club's Prezzi created a  special picture for the show, which was framed, delivered and discussed on line, and held a Google Hangout during the show where listeners discussed the show in real time, and engaged with the presenters - see Thompson engaging with the Hangout on Air. The presenters were interviewed for the Project Kazimierz Podcast in 2015.

Since 2016, the "Digital Planet Listeners" Facebook group has a running theme hashtagged #FlatDarkStanleyNet in which Gareth Mitchell's copy of Jamie Bartlett's The Dark Net containing a bookmark of Mitchell is passed around among listeners. It is based on the Flat Stanley Project.

References

External links
 
 Digital Planet Podcast
 Digital Planet listener's group on Facebook

BBC World Service programmes
BBC news radio programmes